LGBT rights in Norway rank among the highest in the world. In 1981, Norway became one of the first countries in the world to enact an anti-discrimination law explicitly including sexual orientation. Same-sex marriage, adoption, and assisted insemination treatments for lesbian couples have been legal since 2009. In 2016, Norway became the fourth country in Europe to pass a law allowing the change of legal gender for transgender people based on self-determination.

Much like the other Nordic countries, Norway is frequently referred to as one of the world's most LGBT-friendly nations, with high societal acceptance and tolerance of LGBT people. Recent opinion polls have found very high levels of support for same-sex marriage among the Norwegian public.

Legality of same-sex sexual activity

Same-sex sexual activity between men has been legal since 1972. Same-sex acts between women were not penalized in Norway. The age of consent is set at 16 years, regardless of gender and/or sexual orientation.

In April 2022, on the 50th anniversary of the legalization, the government of Norway made formal apologies to all victims of the ban on sex between men.

Recognition of same-sex relationships

On 18 November 2004, two MPs from the Socialist Left Party introduced a bill to abolish the existing registered partnership law, and make the marriage law gender-neutral. The move was withdrawn and replaced by a request that the cabinet further investigate the issue. The conservative cabinet of that time did not look into the issue. However, the second Stoltenberg Cabinet announced a common, unified marriage act as part of its foundation document, the Soria Moria statement. A public hearing was opened on 16 May 2007.

On 29 May 2008, the Associated Press reported that two Norwegian opposition parties had come out in favour of the new bill, assuring its passage in the Storting. Prior to this, there were some disagreements with members of the current three-party governing coalition on whether the bill had enough votes to pass.

On 14 March 2008, the Norwegian Government proposed a marriage bill that would give lesbian and gay couples the same rights as heterosexuals, including religious weddings (if the church so chooses), adoption and assisted pregnancies. The first parliamentary hearing was held on 11 June 2008, where the bill was approved by 84 votes to 41. The new legislation amended the definition of civil marriage to make it gender-neutral. Norway's upper legislative chamber (Lagtinget) passed the bill in a 23–17 vote. The King of Norway granted royal assent thereafter. The law took effect on 1 January 2009.

Prior to the gender-neutral marriage law, a registered partnership law had been in effect since 1993. Partnerskapsloven, as it was known in Norwegian, granted many marriage rights to same-sex couples, only without calling it marriage. Since 1991, unregistered same-sex cohabitation has been recognized by the state for the granting of limited rights, such as being considered as next of kin for medical decisions, and in the event of wrongful death of one partner the other partner was entitled to compensation.

In 2014, the Church of Norway's National Council voted down a proposal to perform same-sex marriages in the church. In 2015, it reversed course and voted to allow same-sex marriages to take place in its churches. The decision was ratified at the annual conference on 11 April 2016.

Adoption and family planning

Married and committed same-sex couples are permitted to adopt under Norwegian law. Stepchild adoption has been allowed for registered partners since 2002. Full adoption rights were granted to same-sex couples in 2009. Additionally, lesbian couples have access to artificial insemination. Pursuant to the same-sex marriage law, when a woman who is married to or in a stable co-habiting relationship with another woman becomes pregnant through artificial insemination, the other partner will have all the rights and duties of parenthood "from the moment of conception".

Military status

Lesbian, gay and bisexual people can serve openly in the Armed Forces. They have had full rights and anti-discrimination protections since 1979. Transgender persons may serve openly as well.

Discrimination protections and hate crime laws
In 1981, Norway became the first country in the world to enact a law to prevent discrimination against LGBT people by amending Paragraph 349a of its Penal Code, prohibiting discrimination based on sexual orientation in the provision of goods or services and in access to public gatherings. In the same year, Paragraph 135a of the Penal Code was amended to prohibit hate speech on account of sexual orientation. The country has banned discrimination based on sexual orientation in employment since 1998. Norway also has a law prohibiting discrimination based on gender identity and expression since 2013, and is one of the few countries in the world to explicitly protect intersex people from discrimination.

Section 5 of the Act on the Prohibition of Discrimination on the grounds of Sexual Orientation, Gender Identity and Gender Expression, enacted in 2013, states as follows:<ref>{{cite web|url=https://app.uio.no/ub/ujur/oversatte-lover/data/lov-20130621-058-eng.pdf|title=Act relating to a prohibition against discrimination on the basis of sexual orientation, gender identity and gender expression (the Sexual Orientation Anti-Discrimination Act)|work=app.uio.no}}</ref>

Bias-motivated violence and speech
According to a 2013 survey entitled "Sexual orientation and living conditions" (Seksuell orientering og levekår) from the University of Bergen, nine out of ten LGBT respondents reported not being exposed to discrimination or harassment at the workplace. In addition, only a small minority stated they had been physically assaulted, and suicide among LGBT people has significantly decreased since the 1990s. Nevertheless, homosexual boys reported a six times higher occurrence of bullying in schools than heterosexual boys.

According to the Oslo Police District, 238 bias-motivated crimes had occurred in Oslo in 2018, of which 20 percent related to LGBT status; the remaining relating to ethnicity (57%), religion (17%), disability (3%) or anti-Semitism (3%).

The Norwegian Institute of Social Research reported in 2019 that LGBT people were more at risk of experiencing hate speech. 15% of LGBT respondents reported having been the target of personal threats, mostly online, compared to 4% among the general population.

In November 2020, the Storting amended the country's hate speech law to protect bisexual and transgender people. The law has protected gay and lesbian people from hate speech since 1981.

Transgender rights
On 18 March 2016, the Solberg Government introduced a bill to allow legal gender changes without any form of psychiatric or psychological evaluation, diagnosis or any kind of medical intervention, by people aged at least 16. Minors aged between 6 and 16 may transition with parental consent. The bill was approved by a vote of 79–13 by Parliament on 6 June. It was promulgated on 17 June and took effect on 1 July 2016. One month after the law took effect, 190 people had already applied to change their gender.

Healthcare

Access to gender affirming healthcare in Norway still requires a psychiatric diagnosis, at which point the patient is referred to the National Treatment Center for Transsexualism at Oslo University Hospital. Treatment is not offered to nonbinary patients. Only a quarter of referred patients are allowed access to gender-affirming healthcare, with those disqualified having no alternative options.

In 2023, one of the leading transgender healthcare providers in Norway was stripped of their medical license over, ostensibly, their advocacy in favor of trans rights.

In March 2023, the Norwegian Healthcare Investigation Board issued recommendations that puberty blockers and hormone therapy for trans adolescents be banned outside of research settings, citing concerns over increases in the number of people seeking such treatment, as well as concerns regarding increased rates of neurodivergence, including ADHD and ASD, among those seeking such care.

Intersex rights
Intersex infants in Norway may undergo medical interventions to have their sex characteristics altered. Human rights groups increasingly consider these surgeries unnecessary and, they argue, should only be performed if the applicant consents to the operation. A 2019 survey from the Oslo University Hospital showed that two out of three medical professionals were willing to perform such surgeries, and parents were overall supportive of the move. In March 2019, the Norwegian Directorate for Children, Youth and Family Affairs published two reports, recommending postponing such medical interventions on intersex infants until they are able to consent.

Conversion therapy
In 2000, the Norwegian Psychiatric Association overwhelmingly voted for the position statement that "homosexuality is no disorder or illness, and can therefore not be subject to treatment. A 'treatment' with the only aim of changing sexual orientation from homosexual to heterosexual must be regarded as ethical malpractice, and should have no place in the health system".

As of December 2019, the Storting is considering a ban on conversion therapy.

Health and blood donation
In Norway, as in many other countries, men who have sex with men (MSM) were previously not allowed to donate blood. In June 2016, the Norwegian Directorate for Health and Social Affairs announced it would make an end to this ban, and implement a 12-month deferral period instead, whereby MSM applicants would be permitted to donate provided they have not had sex in a year. The new 1 year deferral period was implemented on 1 June 2017.

In October 2016, Minister of Health and Care Services Bent Høie made the announcement that the HIV-prevention drug, PrEP, would be offered free of charge as part of Norway's health care system.

Living conditions

Norway is very gay-friendly. The most open and inclusive community can be found in the capital, Oslo, where many gay-friendly events and venues are located including the Raballder Sports Cup and the Oslo Pride Festival. Other events include the Scandinavian Ski Pride held in Hemsedal, Trondheim Pride held in Trondheim and Bergen Pride (Regnbuedagene) in Bergen. 45,000 people participated in the 2019 edition of Oslo Pride, and a further 250,000 attended and watched the event, according to the organisers. Several LGBT associations exist throughout the country, including the Association for Gender and Sexuality Diversity (Foreningen for kjønns- og seksualitetsmangfold), established in 1950 as the first gay organisation in Norway, Queer Youth (Skeiv Ungdom), Gay & Lesbian Health Norway, the Centre for Equality (Likestillingssenteret) and the Transgender Association (Forbundet for Transpersoner), among others. These groups variously offer helplines and counselling to LGBT youth, promote health and HIV prevention and advocate for the legal rights of same-sex couples and transgender individuals. In the far north of Norway, Sápmi Pride is held annually, changing locations between Finland, Sweden and Norway every year. In March 2019, Norway was named the fourth best LGBT-friendly travel destination in the world, tied with Denmark, Iceland and Finland.

The legal situation for same-sex couples is among the best in the world. Norway was the second country, after neighbouring Denmark, to offer registered partnerships to couples with many of the rights of marriage. In 2009, Norway became the sixth country in the world to legalise same-sex marriage, after the Netherlands, Belgium, Spain, Canada and South Africa. Legislation concerning adoption, gender changes for transgender people and anti-discrimination have all been amended in the past decades to include and apply to LGBT people and couples.

In 2015, media reported that there were calls to have a taxi station moved from near the entrance to Oslo's oldest gay pub. Several Muslims claimed that pictures had been taken of them entering the pub by taxi drivers parked at the station; some of these pictures were later distributed widely within Muslim communities.

On 1 September 2016, King Harald V of Norway delivered an impassioned speech in favor of LGBT rights. By 7 September, his speech had received nearly 80,000 likes on Facebook and viewed more than three million times. A part of his speech read as follows:

In July 2020, the Norwegian Government announced that it would give LGBT refugees, alongside vulnerable women and children, priority. The rules only apply for the transfer of refugees from one asylum country to another for permanent resettlement.

Public opinion
Five different polls conducted by Gallup Europe, Sentio, Synovate MMI, Norstat and YouGov in 2003, 2005, 2007, 2008, 2012 and 2013 concluded that 61%, 63%, 66%, 58%, 70% and 78%, respectively, of the Norwegian population supported gender-neutral marriage laws.

In May 2015, PlanetRomeo, an LGBT social network, published its first Gay Happiness Index (GHI). Gay men from over 120 countries were asked about how they feel about society's view on homosexuality, how do they experience the way they are treated by other people and how satisfied are they with their lives. Norway was ranked second, just above Denmark and below Iceland, with a GHI score of 77.

The Norwegian Directorate for Children, Youth and Family Affairs (Bufdir) found that the proportion of people with hostile attitudes towards LGBT+ people has been steadily decreasing; in 2017 7.8% expressed hostile attitudes towards gay people while 11% expressed hostile attitudes towards transgender people.

Transphobia
In the 2020s some tabloid newspapers have been criticized for regularly publishing transphobic content; for example journalism expert Jon Martin Larsen has criticized the newspaper Klassekampen'' for contributing to "incitement and hatred against transgender people."

2021 also saw the formation of anti-transgender groups such as Kvinneaktivistene and a Norwegian branch of Women's Declaration International (formerly WHRC).

Summary table

See also

Criminalization of homosexuality
Same-sex marriage in Norway
Politics of Norway
LGBT rights in Europe
Gaysir
National Association for Lesbians, Gays, Bisexuals and Transgender People

Notes

References